This is a list of electoral results for the Electoral district of Central Murchison in Western Australian colonial elections.

Members for Central Murchison

Election results

Elections in the 1890s

References

Western Australian state electoral results by district